The June 2022 Flagstaff wildfires are an ongoing series of wildfires burning near the city of Flagstaff, Arizona. So far, at least three wildfires have been reported near Flagstaff and have caused hundreds of people to evacuate. However, two of the three reported fires, which are the Haywire and Double fires, combined on June 13. Before the merge of both of the fires, the Double Fire burned . The first wildfire to be discovered was the Pipeline Fire on June 12 at around 10:15 AM (MST); By Monday evening on June 13, the fire burned . As of June 13, 2022, no injuries or deaths have been reported, and one structure has been destroyed.

Wildfires

References 

2022 Arizona wildfires
2022 meteorology
Wildfires in Arizona
June 2022 events in the United States
Events in Coconino County, Arizona